Con O'Neill or Conn O'Neill may refer to:
 Conn O'Neill (d. 1482), lord of Clandeboye in medieval Ireland
 Conn O'Neill, 1st Earl of Tyrone (c. 1480–1559), King of 
 Conn O'Neill (prisoner), seventeenth century Irish aristocrat
 Con O'Neill (actor) (born 1966), British actor 
 Con O'Neill (diplomat) (1912–1988), British diplomat